CoV

Saif Ali Khan (born Sajid Ali Khan on 16 August 1970) is an Indian actor and film producer. Khan is the recipient of several accolades, including a National Film Award and 7 Filmfare Awards, and received the Padma Shri, the fourth highest Indian civilian award, in 2010.

Among Khan's accolades include a National Film Award for Best Actor and 7 Filmfare Awards out of 12 nominations: Best Male Debut for Aashiq Awara (1993), Best Performance in a Comic Role for Dil Chahta Hai (2001) and Hum Tum (2004), Best Supporting Actor for Kal Ho Naa Ho (2003) and Tanhaji: The Unsung Warrior (2020), Best Performance in a Negative Role for Omkara (2006) and "Moto Look of the Year" for Kal Ho Naa Ho (2003).

National Film Awards

Filmfare Awards

IIFA Awards

Zee Cine Awards

Star Screen Awards

Stardust Awards

Other Awards and Recognitions

See also
 List of accolades received by Kal Ho Naa Ho

References

External links
 

Lists of awards received by Indian actor
Awards